Mother Love is a 1989 BBC British television drama. It was adapted by Andrew Davies from Domini Taylor's (Roger Longrigg's) 1983 novel concerning a mother's obsessive love for her son, vengeful hatred of his father, her ex-husband, and the effect on her daughter-in-law and grandchildren. It starred Diana Rigg, David McCallum, James Wilby, and Fiona Gillies, and was directed by Simon Langton.

Christopher "Kit" Vesey (James Wilby) and Angela Vesey (Fiona Gillies), a British yuppie couple, enjoy a seemingly idyllic life. Yet there is one troubling factor in their lives - Kit's mother Helena (Diana Rigg), an eccentric and often difficult woman consumed by anger with Kit's father (David McCallum), a famed conductor with whom she believes Kit has no contact.
Her oddness is confirmed in a series of incidents involving her ex-husband and his second wife Ruth (Isla Blair), an artist. Flashbacks throughout the series reveal bits of Helena's troubled past. Little by little, the young couple's life begins to fall apart as Helena begins to act out her feelings of intense jealousy and desire for revenge, implicating a dear old friend and leading to murder.

Cast

Diana Rigg as Helena
James Wilby as Kit
David McCallum as Alex
Fiona Gillies as Angela
Isla Blair as Ruth
James Grout as George Batt
Liliana Komorowska as Danuta
Ann Firbank as Mrs Turner
Jeffry Wickham as Brigadier Turner
Holly Aird as Emily
Grant Parsons as Leo
Amelia Shankley as Harriet
Deborah Grant as Helena's Mother
Romolo Bruni as Waiter
Natasha Byrne as Rachel Turner
Katharyn Ballantine as Tiggy Turner
Gary Fairhall as Photographer
Gareth Forwood as Boris
Michael Dore as Singer
Louisa Janes as Young Helena
Anna Price as Maureen
Colin Stinton as Concert Hall Manager
Margaret Boyle as Neighbour
John Grillo, Carl Duering as Art Critics
Irene Marot as Woman Journalist
Susan McCulloch as Soprano
Joan Bakewell as TV Commentator
Cordelia Roche as Jordan
Jonathan Burn as Chief Inspector Strachan
Trevor Cooper as Sergeant Bear
Rob Edwards as Consultant
Elizabeth Ash as Vicky
Franco Trevisi as Rossini
Timothy Kightley as Vicar
Angela Goodwin as Betsy Lazerhorn
Penny Darch as Miss Pope
Rosemary Frankau as School Secretary
Dominic St. Clair as Blenkinsop
Deborah Barrymore as Air Stewardess
Calvin Simpson as Porter
Cynthia Powell as Nurse
Sophie Thursfield as Nurse Sheila
Francis Atkinson as Sharon
Magdalena Buznea as Cleaner
Badi Uzzaman as Mini Cab Driver
Naomi Kerbel as Olivia
Rebecca Sabin as Lavinia
Claire Shepherd as Laura

Plot
Kit Vesey, a London barrister, has proposed to Angela Turner, a receptionist at an art gallery. He is fearful about breaking this news to his fiercely controlling mother, Helena, but they do. Kit also insists that Angela not mention anything to Helena about their going to visit his father Alex, who divorced Helena and remarried many years ago. Helena has blocked all mention of Alex from her life and even threatened to commit suicide when Kit once suggested going to live with him. Accepted by Helena, the Veseys settle into marriage and have two children, all the while maintaining a secret relationship with Alex and his new family. However, when Helena sees an arts programme about Alex's wife Ruth, a renowned photographer, she conspires to kill Ruth by locking her in her darkroom with the ventilators blocked and contrives evidence to convict Helena's driver, George.

While visiting Rome, Alex meets Jordan, an American actress whom he subsequently marries and whom later gives birth to twins. As Kit is paralysed following surgery on a brain tumour, Helena comes to tend to him in hospital but starts to uncover other evidence about how Angela has been visiting Alex. After watching Angela leave Alex's home and interpreting the evident affection between the two of them as evidence that Angela was having an affair with Alex, Helena becomes increasingly unhinged. While at the hospital one day, she informs the paralysed Kit that she intends to poison Alex and Jordan's twins using laburnum in return for the pair's 'treachery.' Having tested the effectiveness of laburnum on a neighbour's cat, Helena laces some marzipan shortbreads with the poison and gives them to her grandchildren, knowing that they would likely give them to the twins at Alex's party.

Helena's plan fails, however, as another girl at the party, Olivia, steals one of the shortbreads while the rest of the guests are outside taking a photo together, and she is subsequently discovered in a convulsive state in the garden. After the family receive a strange call purporting to be from the hospital, Angela realises that it must have been Helena who poisoned the shortbreads and who had called the family only to be told that Alex's family did have contact with Kit. Angela rushes to the hospital at the same time as Helena starts removing Kit from his life support machine for his 'treachery.' Angela arrives to find Helena embracing Kit whilst he struggles to breathe and calls nurses over, who discover that Helena had, in fact, forced him out of his paralysis. The final scene shows Helena in a prison cell, staring emptily at a wall.

Awards
Diana Rigg won the British Academy Television Award for Best Actress for her portrayal of Helena.

BAFTA nominations for Mother Love included: 
Best Drama Series/Serial - Ken Riddington, Simon Langton, Andrew Davies. 
Best Film Editor - Ray Wingrove. 
Best Film Sound - Barrie Tharby, Keith Marriner, Graham Lawrence.

Broadcasts
Mother Love first aired in its original four-parts from 29 October to 19 November 1989 on BBC One with a BBC Two repeat the following year. In 1991 it was broadcast on the PBS programme Mystery!, of which Rigg was the host. It was broadcast on Sky Arts in the early 2010s. 

Following the death of Diana Rigg, it was repeated on 22–23 December 2020 on BBC Four in two parts.

It has not been officially released on VHS or DVD.

References

External links
Mother Love at the British Film Institute

 
 

1989 British television series debuts
1989 British television series endings
1980s British drama television series
BBC television dramas
1980s British television miniseries
Television shows based on British novels
Television shows written by Andrew Davies
BAFTA winners (television series)
English-language television shows
Television shows set in London